Jafad Moradi (born April 14, 1984) is an Iranian football player currently play for Persita Tangerang in Indonesia Super League.

References

External links
JAFAD MORADI  at Liga Indonesia

1984 births
Living people
Iranian footballers
Iranian expatriate footballers
Iranian expatriate sportspeople in Indonesia
Expatriate footballers in Indonesia
Liga 1 (Indonesia) players
Persita Tangerang players
Association football midfielders